A Nepali Passport is issued from the Ministry of Foreign Affairs of the Nepal to Nepali citizens for the purpose of international travel. The Department of Passport (DoP), a Department under Ministry of Foreign Affairs functions as the issuing authority and is responsible for issuing Nepali passports on application to all eligible Nepali citizens. It enables the bearer to travel internationally and serves as proof of Nepali citizenship.

 

Ordinary Nepali passports are chocolate brown in color with a chip symbol on their cover, which is commonly known as e-passport.  it has Coat of arms of Nepal emblazoned in the center of the front cover. The words Nepali: "राहदानी" and "नेपाल " are inscribed above the coat of arms and words English: "PASSPORT" and "NEPAL" are inscribed below the coat of arms. The ordinary e-passport contains either 34 pages or 66 pages.

History

Early passports
The early passports in Nepal were used for internal and external travel for religious and business purposes. The oldest passport in Nepal is a handwritten passport issued in  1957 BS to a person named Kaliprasad (no surname disclosed) and his ten porters to travel to Butwal and Taulihawa from Kathmandu. The passport holder is identified with their physical description because there was no photography available at that time. A guarantor was needed to issue the passport. These old passports are showcased in the passport museum in Kathmandu.

Modern passports
The modern passports were issued in 2012 BS. The first of this kind was issued in 10 Shrawan 2012 BS which was issued by the secretary of the ministry. These passports were in a form of sheet paper. The booklet form of the passport was issued in the 1960s. It is estimated that about 1 lakh passport was issued in sheet paper form.  Up to 2052 BS, all passports were issued in Kathmandu only. This was changed in 2052 BS to issue a passport from five development regions as per government's policy of decentralization.

Machine readable passport (MRP)
As a member of International Civil Aviation Organization (ICAO) Nepal was obliged to issue machine-readable passports (MRP) after 2010. Nepal stopped issuing hand-written passports on 31 March 2010.

Electronic passport
On 17 November 2021, the first electronic passport, or e-passport was introduced and Nepalese writer Satya Mohan Joshi was the first to receive the e-passport.

The Nepalis e-passports are produced by IDEMIA, the software that the Passport office uses is also from the same company.

Other forms of passport
All traditional hand written passports were honoured as a bona fide travel document issued by the Nepalese Government until 24 November 2015. All traditional passports are withdrawn from circulation as of November 2015.

Design
Each passport contains a note in English from the foreign ministry that is addressed to the authorities of all other states, identifying the bearer as a citizen of that state and requesting that he or she be allowed to pass and be treated according to international norms. The note inside Nepalese passport says:

Current e-passport contains the following data:
Type 
Passport Number
Surname
Given Names
Nationality
Date of Birth
Gender
Date of Issue
Date of Expiry
Citizenship/ National Identity Number
Place of Birth
Issuing Authority
Holder's Signature

Types of passports
There are 4 different types of passports issued by the government of Nepal. These are ordinary, official, diplomatic and travel documents. These passports are distinguished by their cover. The cover of ordinary e-passports is chocolate-brown. Diplomatic e-passports have a crimson-red cover, official e-passports navy-blue, and peacekeepers' e-passports are tiger-orange colour.

Issuence of passport

Fees
As of 2022, an ordinary e-passports is issued for NPR 5,000 (adult 34 pages), NPR 10,000 (adult 66 pages), NPR 12,000 (Fast track service, 34 pages), NPR 20,000 (Fast track service, 66 pages). 
Applicants for Nepalese passports are required to pay the authorised passport issuing office a sum of NPR 15000 or NPR 12,000 for issuance of passport on same day of application or for the day after the day of application respectively. Or, the sum of 10,000.00 (US $90.76 ) as fees for an Ordinary passport for urgent processing which takes 3–4 business day and NPR 5,000 for normal processing. Urgent processing is done by the ministry of foreign affairs and takes 2 to 3 days. Normal processing takes around 4 weeks but sometime it may take up to 6 weeks and is done from the Chief District officer's office. However, the Official and the Diplomatic passports are exempted from fees.

Validity period
The passports are valid for 10 years from the date of issue and are issued by the Central Passport Office, District Administration Office in all 77 district headquarters as well as Nepalese Embassy's and Consulates abroad. However, as per new regulation, validity is for 5 years in case of minor under 10 years of age.

Visa requirements

In 2016, Nepalese citizens had visa-free or visa on arrival access to 38 countries and territories, ranking the Nepalese passport 98th in the world according to the Visa Restrictions Index. Passports are not needed by citizens of India and Nepal to travel within each other's country by land or by air, but some identification may be required for border crossing or at the airport.

Issues with Passport Distribution 

 Complaints of long lines at Babarmahal Passport Office are common as of January, 2023. This the passport office claims is because of very high demand and insufficient capacity in printing and distribution of completed passports. 

 Passport distribution disruption: Passport printing and distribution was halted since 3 January, 2023 Passport office claimed it as a software issue and that technicians from IDEMIA  (passport and passport software provider) are looking into it. Passport distribution was resumed 7 January, 2023.

Gallery

See also 
 Department of Passport (Nepal)
 Visa policy of Nepal
 Visa requirements for Nepalese citizens
 National Identity Card (Nepal)

References

Foreign relations of Nepal
Passports by country